The Russian Party in Estonia (VEE) was a minor political party in Estonia.

History
The party was originally established as the Russian National Union, a right-of-centre party, in 1920. It received 1% of the national vote in the parliamentary elections that year, winning a single seat in the Riigikogu.

After Estonia regained independence after the fall of the Soviet Union, the Russian Party of Estonia was established in 1994 as the legal successor to the Russian National Union. For the 1995 elections the party formed the "Our Home is Estonia" alliance with the Estonian United People's Party. The alliance won six seats.

The party ran alone in the 1999 elections, receiving 2% of the vote but failing to win a seat. The 2003 elections saw the party's vote share fall to just 0.2% as it remained without representation in the Riigikogu. It received 0.2% of the vote again in the 2007 elections and 0.9% in the 2011 elections, failing to win a seat on either occasion.

In 2012 the party merged into the Social Democratic Party.

Election results

References

Defunct political parties in Estonia
1920 establishments in Estonia
1994 establishments in Estonia
2012 disestablishments in Estonia
Political parties established in 1920
Political parties established in 1994
Political parties disestablished in 2012
Russian political parties in Estonia
Russian minority interests parties